Tāvini Huiraʻatira (English: People's Servant / Serve the People), also known as Tāvini huiraʻatira nō te ao māʻohi - FLP ("Serving the indigenous people"), is a pro-independence, anti-nuclear political party in French Polynesia. Founded in 1977 as the Front de libération de la Polynésie (FLP), the party has been led since its inception by Oscar Temaru. From 2004 to 2013 it was part of the Union for Democracy (UPLD) coalition.

The Tavini has primarily been an opposition party, but between 2004 and 2013 governed French Polynesia at various times as part of various coalition arrangements.

History
The party was founded in 1977 by Oscar Temaru under the name the Front for the Liberation of Polynesia (FLP). In 1983 it changed its name to Tāvini huiraʻatira nō te ao māʻohi - FLP and adopted the motto Te Atua tāʻu fatu ("The Lord is my master"). It contested the 1983 municipal elections, which saw Temaru win the mayoralty of Faʻaʻā for the first time.

At the 1986 election the party won two seats in the Assembly of French Polynesia. It won four seats at the 1991 election, ten at the 1996 election, and 13 at the 2001 election.

At the 2004 elections it joined with Aia Api, Here Ai'a, and  Ia Mana te Nunaa to form the Union for Democracy (UPLD) coalition. The coalition won 27 out of 57 seats.  Defeated president Gaston Flosse attempted to have the elections declared invalid in an effort to retain power, and the colonial government threatened financial sanctions if Temaru was elected, but Temaru was elected President of French Polynesia on 14 June 2004. He was ousted in a no-confidence vote four months later, beginning an extended period in which the presidency alternated between Temaru, Flosse, and Gaston Tong Sang. The coalition won 19 of 57 seats at the 2008 election, but the alternation of governments and coalition rearrangements continued. Temaru was re-elected president with the support of Tahoera'a Huiraatira in February 2009, lost power again in November, and was re-elected again in April 2011. The UPLD-led coalition then held power until its defeat at the 2013 elections. Shortly after the elections the United Nations restored French Polynesia to the United Nations list of non-self-governing territories, a key goal of the Tavini.

In the 2017 French legislative election election, Moetai Brotherson became the first member of Tavini Huiraatira elected to the French National Assembly.

At the 2018 election the party won only eight seats.

In the 2022 French National Assembly election the party won all three of the French Polynesian constituencies.

On 10 March 2023 the party announced that Moetai Brotherson would be their candidate for the presidency in the 2023 French Polynesian legislative election. It released its full party list on 17 March.

Election results

Territorial elections

References

External links
TĀVINI HUIRA’ATIRA NŌ TE AO MĀ’OHI website

Political parties in French Polynesia
Political parties established in 1977
Pro-independence parties
Separatism in France
1977 establishments in French Polynesia